Provincial Trunk Highway 12 (PTH 12) is a provincial primary highway located in the Canadian province of Manitoba. Lying entirely in the Eastman Region, it runs from the U.S. border (where it meets with Minnesota State Highway 313) to a dead end in Grand Beach. PTH 12 forms the Manitoba section of MOM's Way, a tourist route from Thunder Bay to Winnipeg.  PTH 12 is primarily a two-lane highway except for two four-lane stretch between Steinbach and PTH 1 (22 kilometres) and a ten-kilometre concurrency with PTH 44.

History
PTH 12 was originally designated in 1928 and followed the Old Dawson Trail from St. Boniface to Ste. Anne.   In the 1950s, it was extended south to Sarto, then southeast to Zhoda, Piney, South Junction, and eventually Sprague.  The original portion of PTH 12 was decommissioned (most of it is now part of Provincial Road 207) and then extended north to Beausejour and Pine Falls, replacing PTH 22 north of Anola. A spur, Manitoba Highway 12V, was created from PTH 12 to Victoria Beach from the part of PTH 22 that was not replaced by PTH 12. Another spur, Manitoba Highway 12G, was created from PTH 12 to Grand Beach as a renumbering of PTH 22A. In 1960, PTH 12 was extended southeast to the Minnesota border. In 1966, the section of PTH 12 from PTH 12V to Pine Falls became part of PTH 11, and the section of PTH 12 from PTH 12G to PTH 12V, along with PTH 12V itself, became part of PTH 59. At the same time, PTH 12 was rerouted over PTH 12G.

Major intersections

See also

References

External links 
Official Name and Location - Declaration of Provincial Trunk Highways Regulation - The Highways and Transportation Act - Provincial Government of Manitoba
Official Highway Map - Published and maintained by the Department of Infrastructure - Provincial Government of Manitoba (see Legend and Map#3)
Google Maps Search - Provincial Trunk Highway 12

012
Manitoba 012
Transport in Steinbach, Manitoba